Puthezhath Raman Menon (19 October 1891 – 22 September 1973) was an Indian writer of Malayalam literature. Known for essays, historical writings, biographies and translations, Menon was the first to translate Tagore's works into Malayalam. He was a judge at the Kerala High Court and was a recipient of the title, Sahitya Kushalan, conferred on him by the Rajah of Cochin. Kerala Sahitya Akademi honoured him with the distinguished fellowship in 1971.

Biography 

Puthezhath Raman Menon was born in an ancient Nair family on 19 October 1891 at Manaloor, in Thrissur district of the South Indian state of Kerala to Kodaykkattu Parameshwara Menon and Pappi Amma.  After completing school education at Church Mission Society Higher Secondary School, Thrissur, he did his regular college education at Maharaja's College, Ernakulam and Madras Christian College before securing a degree in law to start a career as a lawyer at Thrissur. Later, he became a special prosecutor at the Magistrate Court in Thrissur and went on to hold such positions as those of a District Judge and Sarvadhikaryakkar to end his official career as a judge of the Kerala High Court.

Menon, who served as the president of the Kerala Sahitya Akademi for five years from 1961 to 1966, was married to Moothedathu Janaki Amma, who was the foster daughter of one of his uncles. He died on 22 September 1973, at the age of 81.

Legacy and honours 
Menon's entry into literature was by publishing humorous satires but later, he wrote general essays, biographies, historical books and translations. He was the first to translate the works of Rabindranath Tagore into Malayalam. His book, Sakthan Thampuran - Historical Novel, published in 1942, is one of the small number of books which detail the life of Sakthan Thampuran, the erstwhile Rajah of Cochin. His essays on Thrissur was later compiled as a book, Thrissur Trichur which has details about the cultural history of the place, its literary milieu and about Thrissur Pooram. He was also associated with Kairali magazine, where he worked alongside G. Sankara Kurup and Joseph Mundassery, though there were rumours of a rift between Kurup and Menon due to a remark made by Menon that no Malayalam writers deserved the Jnanapith Award, later won by Kurup in 1965.

Menon, whose autobiography was titled Kazhchappadukal, was conferred with the title of Sahitya Kushalan by the Rajah of Cochin. In 1971, he was inducted as a distinguished fellow by the Kerala Sahitya Akademi.

Bibliography

See also 

 List of Malayalam-language authors by category
 List of Malayalam-language authors

References

External links 
 
 

1891 births
1987 deaths
Writers from Kerala
20th-century Indian essayists
People from Thrissur district
Recipients of the Kerala Sahitya Akademi Award
Maharaja's College, Ernakulam alumni
Madras Christian College alumni
20th-century Indian judges
20th-century Indian non-fiction writers
Judges of the Kerala High Court
20th-century Indian lawyers
20th-century Indian translators
20th-century Indian historians